Jack Halpern (b. 1946;) is a Japan-based lexicographer specializing in Chinese characters, namely kanji. He is best known as editor-in-chief of the Kodansha Kanji Learner's Dictionary and as the inventor of the SKIP system for kanji lookup. Halpern is also an active unicyclist, having served as founder and president of the International Unicycling Federation. He currently resides in Saitama, Japan.

Personal life
Jack Halpern was born in 1946. Through his early years, he moved through six different countries including France, Brazil and the United States, picking up numerous local languages. After studying astronomy at university, he began a business offering technical translation services. In 1968, while traveling, Halpern met a Japanese citizen who introduced him to kanji, beginning his lifelong interest in Chinese characters. He moved to Japan with his family in 1973, where he continues to live with his wife and two children. There, he has founded the Japan Yiddish Club, currently the only Yiddish-teaching organization in Japan. Through the club, he continues to teach Yiddish lessons at the Jewish Community Center in Shibuya, Tokyo.

Within Japan, Halpern is well known for his public appearances. In addition to having published regular columns in Japanese magazines and periodicals and having appeared on numerous variety shows, Halpern has given hundreds of public lectures on lexicography, language-learning, and other language- and culture-related topics. He was formerly a fellow at Showa Women's University.

Halpern plays the quena, a traditional Andean flute. He has played with the Japan-based Grupo Tortuguita since 2002.

Halpern is a noted polyglot with speaking ability in eleven languages: English, Japanese, Hebrew, Yiddish, Portuguese, Spanish, German, Chinese, Esperanto, Arabic, and Vietnamese. His reading ability extends to Ladino, Papiamento, and Aramaic.

CJK Dictionary Institute

Halpern is CEO of the CJK Dictionary Institute (CJKI), which specializes in dictionary compilation for Chinese, Japanese, Korean, Arabic, and other languages. With CJKI, Halpern has published various lexicographical tools for language learners including the Kodansha Kanji Learner's Dictionary and the New Japanese–English Character Dictionary. CJKI has also produced a large number of technical dictionaries covering such topics as mechanical engineering, economics, and medicine. Aside from dictionary compilation, CJKI maintains and licenses large-scale lexical databases covering a total of approximately 24 million entries in Japanese, Chinese, Korean, and Arabic.

Unicycling
Halpern is an avid unicyclist. In addition to being a former Guinness world record holder for fastest 100 mile run on a unicycle, he has played a major role in the spread of unicycling as a sport throughout Japan, the United States, Canada, China, and other countries. In 1978, he introduced unicycling to Japan by founding the Japan Unicycle Club (JUC), for which he served as the first chairman. Subsequently, he served as executive director of the club's successor, the Japan Unicycling Association (JUA), until 2012. His book, Anyone Can Ride a Unicycle, credited as the first Japanese-language book to explain how to ride the unicycle, is still included with purchases of certain models of unicycle in Japan. In 1980, Halpern founded the International Unicycling Federation, serving as its first elected president. From 1984 until 2001, Halpern served continuously as either president and later vice president of the federation, helping to popularize competitive unicycling throughout the world. As a part of this effort, he helped to organize the first ten UNICON conferences from 1984 until 2000. In 1993, Halpern introduced competitive unicycling to China by organizing the first Great Wall Unicycle Marathon.

Principal publications
Jack Halpern is the author of dozens of books and articles. Below is a list of selected publications:

References

External links
CJKI home page
The International Unicycling Federation
The New Japanese-English Character Dictionary
The Japan Unicycling Association
Interview with Jack Halpern

Japanese people of German-Jewish descent
20th-century German Jews
Lexicographers
Linguists from Japan
Living people
1946 births